Chongqing University Station is a station on Loop line of Chongqing Rail Transit in Chongqing municipality, China, which is located in Shapingba District, adjacent to the main campus of Chongqing University. It opened in 2018.

The former name of this station was Shazhengjie (Chinese: 沙正街), which was replaced in 2019.

References

Railway stations in Chongqing
Railway stations in China opened in 2018
Chongqing Rail Transit stations